Richard Albert Bordi (born April 18, 1959) is a former Major League Baseball relief pitcher who played from  to . He played for the Oakland Athletics, Seattle Mariners, Chicago Cubs, New York Yankees and Baltimore Orioles. He attended Fresno State University. He is currently a scout for the Cincinnati Reds.

In 1977, he was drafted in the 5th round (119th overall) by the Minnesota Twins. He opted not to sign. In 1980, he was drafted by the Athletics in the 3rd round, 56th overall.

In the same year, he was drafted he made his major league debut (July 16, 1980). He was 21 years old. In that game (and his lone game that season), he pitched 2 innings and gave up only one run.

He bounced around between the minors and Majors between 1980 and 1983, finally settling as a full-time reliever in 1984 with the Cubs (to whom he'd been traded along with Porfi Altamirano, Henry Cotto and Ron Hassey for Ray Fontenot and Brian Dayett). Between 1984 and 1986 with the Cubs, Yankees and Orioles, he had an ERA well under 4.00. After those three fairly successful seasons, his career quickly went in the wrong direction. He ended up with the Athletics in his final season, 1988, where he started two games and lost one of them  (won zero). His final game was July 19, 1988. He was 29 years old when he retired.

In his record 130 stolen base season in 1982, Rickey Henderson stole his 102nd and 103rd base off Bordi on August 4, 1982. He stole 2nd and 3rd, all in the first inning.

Bordi was the last player signed by Charlie Finley. Currently, he lives in Rohnert Park, California.

External links

1959 births
Oakland Athletics players
Seattle Mariners players
Chicago Cubs players
New York Yankees players
Baltimore Orioles players
Cincinnati Reds scouts
Miami Marlins scouts
San Diego Padres scouts
West Haven Whitecaps players
Living people
Major League Baseball pitchers
Baseball players from California
People from South San Francisco, California
Fresno State Bulldogs baseball players